Adult lifetime cannabis use by country is the lifetime prevalence of cannabis use among all adults in surveys among the general population. Lifetime prevalence means any use of cannabis during a person's life.

Table

Age range is the range the data computation is based on.

Map

See also

Annual cannabis use by country
Legality of cannabis
Decriminalization of non-medical marijuana in the United States
Effects of cannabis
Legal and medical status of cannabis
Legality of cannabis by country
Removal of cannabis from Schedule I of the Controlled Substances Act
Single Convention on Narcotic Drugs

References

External links
These Are The European Nations That Smoke The Most Pot. By Nick Jardine. 18 October 2011. Business Insider.

 Adult lifetime
Cannabis use
Cannabis-related lists